Milsom Street in Bath, Somerset, England was built in 1762 by Thomas Lightholder. The buildings were originally grand town houses, but most are now used as shops, offices and banks. Most have three storeys with mansard roofs and Corinthian columns.

Numbers 2 to 22 are grade II listed. The bank at number 24 was built by Wilson and Willcox and includes baroque detail not seen on the other buildings. Numbers 25 to 36 continue the architectural theme from numbers 2 to 22.

Numbers 37 to 42 which are known as Somersetshire Buildings have been designated as Grade II* listed buildings.

The Octagon Chapel was a place of worship, then a furniture shop by Mallett Antiques Opened briefly as a restaurant, which has subsequently closed. It is accessed beside number 46.

As a fashionable Georgian thoroughfare, Milsom Street is quoted in several of the works of Jane Austen, including Northanger Abbey and Persuasion.

In the 2010 Google Street View Best Streets Awards,  Milsom Street was voted "Britain's Best Fashion Street" by the 11,000 participants.

See also

 List of Grade I listed buildings in Bath and North East Somerset
Milsom Street website Milsomstreet.co.uk

References

Houses completed in 1762
Grade I listed buildings in Bath, Somerset
Streets in Bath, Somerset
Grade II listed buildings in Bath, Somerset